Suerococha (possibly from Quechua suyru a very long dress tracked after when worn, qucha lake) is a mountain in the south of the Huayhuash mountain range in the Andes of Peru, about  high, and the name of a small lake near the mountain. The mountain is located in the Lima Region, Cajatambo Province, Cajatambo District. It lies east of Cuyoc.

References

Mountains of Peru
Mountains of Lima Region
Lakes of Lima Region
Lakes of Peru